Gogmagog (also Goemagot, Goemagog, Goëmagot and Gogmagoc) was a legendary giant in Welsh and later English mythology. According to Geoffrey of Monmouth's Historia Regum Britanniae ("The History of The Kings of Britain", 12th century), he was a giant inhabitant of Albion, thrown off a cliff during a wrestling match with Corineus (a companion of Brutus of Troy). Gogmagog was the last of the Giants found by Brutus and his men inhabiting the land of Albion.

The effigies of Gogmagog and Corineus, used in English pageantry and later instituted as guardian statues at Guildhall in London eventually earned the familiar names "Gog and Magog".

Etymology

Geoffrey of Monmouth

Gogmagog ("Goemagot", "Goemagog") in the legend of the founding of Britain as written by Geoffrey of Monmouth in Historia Regum Britanniae (1136). The island of Albion was once inhabited by giants, but their numbers had dwindled and few remained. Gogmagog was one of these last giants, and was slain by Corineus, a member of the invading Trojan colonizers headed by Brutus. Corineus was subsequently granted a piece of land that was named "Cornwall" after him.

The Historia details the encounter as follows: Gogmagog, accompanied by twenty fellow giants, attacked the Trojan settlement and caused great slaughter. The Trojans rallied back and killed all giants, except for "one detestable monster named Gogmagog, in stature twelve cubits, and of such prodigious strength that at one shake he pulled up an oak as if it had been a hazel wand". He is captured so that Corineus can wrestle with him. The giant breaks three of Corineus's ribs, which so enrages him that he picks up the giant and carries him on his shoulders to the top of a high rock, from which he throws the giant down into the sea. The place where he fell was known as "Gogmagog's Leap" to posterity.

Archbishop Michael Joseph Curley suggests that Monmouth may have been inspired by the giant Antaeus in Lucan's Pharsalia, who was defeated by Hercules in a wrestling match by lifting him from the earth, the source of his strength; both giants lived in caves and gave their names to a place.

Later versions
Gogmagog's combat with Corineus according to Geoffrey was repeated in Wace's Anglo-Norman Brut and Layamon's Middle-English Brut. Because Geoffrey's work is regarded as fact until the late 17th Century, the story has continued to appear in most early histories of Britain.

The tale of Gogmagog's ancestry was composed later in the 14th century. Known as the "Albina story" (or Des Grantz Geanz), it claimed Gogmagog to be a giant descended from Albina and her sisters, thirty daughters of the king of Greece exiled to the land later to be known as "Albion". This story was added as a prologue to later versions of Brut pseudo-history,

Thus according to the Middle English prose version of the Brut, known as the Chronicles of England, Albina was the daughter of Syrian king named Diodicias, from whom Gogmagog and Laugherigan and the other giants of Albion are descended. These giants lived in caves and hills until being conquered by Brutus' party arriving in "Tottenesse" (Totnes, Devon). A later chapter describes Gogmagog's combat Corineus (Middle English:Coryn) "at Totttenes", more or less as according to Geoffrey. Gogmagog was the tallest of these giants; Coryn in comparison was at least the largest man from the waist upward among Brutus's crew. Caxton's printed edition, The Cronycles of Englond (1482), closely matches this content.

Raphael Holinshed also localizes the event of the "leape of Gogmagog" at Dover, But William Camden in his 1586 work Brittannia locates it on Plymouth Hoe, perhaps following Richard Carew's Survey of Cornwall. Carew describes "the portraiture of two men, one bigger, the other lesser.. (whom they term "Gogmagog") which was cut upon the ground at the Hawe (i.e. The Hoe) in Plymouth...". These figures were first recorded in 1495 and were destroyed by the construction of the Royal Citadel in 1665.

Michael Drayton's Poly-Olbion preserves the tale as well:

Guardians of London

The Lord Mayor's account of Gogmagog says that the Roman Emperor Diocletian had thirty-three wicked daughters. He found thirty-three husbands for them to curb their wicked ways; they chafed at this, and under the leadership of the eldest sister, Alba, they murdered their husbands. For this crime they were set adrift at sea; they washed ashore on a windswept island, which they named "Albion"—after Alba. Here they coupled with demons and gave birth to a race of giants, whose descendants included Gog and Magog. The effigies of two giants were recorded in 1558 at the coronation of Elizabeth I and were described as "Gogmagot the Albion" and "Corineus the Britain". These, or similar figures, made of "wickerwork and pasteboard" made regular appearances in the Lord Mayor's Show thereafter, although they became known as Gog and Magog over the years. New figures were carved from pine in 1709 by Captain Richard Saunders and displayed in the Guildhall until 1940 when they were destroyed in an air-raid; they were replaced by David Evans in 1953.

Images of Gog and Magog (depicted as giants) are carried by Lord Mayors of the City of London in a traditional procession in the Lord Mayor's Show each year on the second Saturday of November.

In French literature

Under the influence of Geoffrey's Gogmagog (Goemagot), Gos et Magos, the French rendition of "Gog and Magog", were recast in the role of enemies defeated by the giant Gargantua, and taken prisoner to King Arthur who held court in London in Rabelais's Gargantua (1534). Gargantua's son Pantagruel also had an ancestor named Gemmagog, whose name was also a corruption of "Gog and Magog", influenced by the British legend.

In Irish folklore

Works of Irish mythology, including the Lebor Gabála Érenn (the Book of Invasions), expand on the Genesis account of Magog as the son of Japheth and make him the ancestor to the Irish through Partholón, leader of the first group to colonize Ireland after the Deluge, and a descendant of Magog, as also were  the Milesians, the people of the 5th invasion of Ireland. Magog was also the progenitor of the Scythians, as well as of numerous other races across Europe and Central Asia. His three sons were Boath, Jobhath, and Fathochta.

Explanatory notes

References

Bibliography

 
 

British folklore
English giants
English folklore
London folklore
Gog and Magog